Riani is an Italian surname. Notable people with the surname include:

 Ariel Riani (1926–2019), Uruguayan politician
 Paolo Riani (born 1937), Italian architect
  (born 1989), French singer

Italian-language surnames